Joseph Goutorbe (25 April 1916 – 14 March 2002) was a French racing cyclist. He rode in the 1938 Tour de France. He most notably won the Paris–Camembert in 1942 and the Critérium National de la Route in 1945.

Major results
1942
 1st Paris–Camembert
1943
 1st 
 7th Critérium National de la Route
 10th Paris–Roubaix
1945
 1st Critérium National de la Route
 2nd Paris–Tours
 3rd Road race, National Road Championships

References

1916 births
2002 deaths
French male cyclists